The River Tern (also historically known as the Tearne) is a river in Shropshire, England. It rises north-east of Market Drayton in the north of the county. The source of the Tern is considered to be the lake in the grounds of Maer Hall, Staffordshire.

Extensive peat bog formerly existed, extending from Crudgington on the Tern as far as Newport.

 
At Longdon-on-Tern, the Tern is spanned by the Longdon-on-Tern Aqueduct, the world's first large-scale cast iron navigable aqueduct, designed by Thomas Telford to carry the Shrewsbury Canal.

References

External links 
 Tern Views - a detailed description with photographs

Tributaries of the River Severn
Rivers of Shropshire